Koos Formsma (born 1957 in Leeuwarden, Friesland) is a Dutch businessman and former chairman of Dutch football club SC Heerenveen. A former field hockey player from HC Bloemendaal, Formsma became the club's chairman on 1 October 2006 after Riemer van der Velde resigned his 23-year spell at the team. Formsma was also director of the company Regma Nederland, located in Lelystad, which he sold to Canon in 2012.

References

External links

1957 births
Living people
Dutch football chairmen and investors
SC Heerenveen
Dutch businesspeople
Sportspeople from Leeuwarden
HC Bloemendaal players
Dutch male field hockey players